Nogometno društvo Ilirija 1911 is a Slovenian football club from Ljubljana which competes in the Slovenian Second League. The club was founded in June 1911 and is the oldest still active football club in the country.

History

SK Ilirija (1911–1941)
At the beginning of the 20th century, football came to Ljubljana from Vienna and was played mostly by the students. Football club Ilirija was founded on 9 June 1911 in a pub called Roža on Židovska cesta in Ljubljana. Albin Kandare was elected as the first president of Ilirija, and their first ground was at Tivoli Park. Ilirija's first match was played on 30 July 1911, and ended in an 18–0 defeat against Hermes, the local students' club which had been founded in 1910. Soon after their first match Ilirija merged with Hermes in 1913. In the first few years Ilirija had no competition in Slovenia and they mainly played friendly matches against Zagreb-based Croatian clubs such as HAŠK, Građanski and Concordia. An important turning point was a friendly with the Czech side Slavia Prague in Ljubljana played on 5 August 1913, which Ilirija lost 10–0. However, Ilirija's players and staff were impressed by Slavia's display of professionally trained football so much that they convinced Slavia's player Jirkovský to stay in Ljubljana and work as Ilirija's first manager after the match. The best and most popular players of Ilirija of that time were Stanko Tavčar, Ernest Turk, Stanko Pelan and Oto Oman.

At the onset of World War I, Ilirija and Slovan (founded in 1913 and still active today) were the only two football clubs in Slovenia, and during the war all football activities were suspended. In 1919 Ilirija was re-activated, and was soon followed by Slovan. Football rapidly gained popularity and a number of other Slovenian clubs came into life around the same time such as Olimp in Celje, I. SSK Maribor in Maribor and AŠK Primorje in Ljubljana, with the latter becoming Ilirija's biggest rivals in the following decade.

Ilirija then became the first regional champions of Slovenia (which was at the time part of the Kingdom of Yugoslavia), winning the inaugural Slovenian championship in 1920, and proceeded to win a total of 12 Slovenian titles between 1920 and 1935. By the mid-1930s both Ilirija and Primorje encountered financial difficulties which led to their merger and the formation of SK Ljubljana football club in 1936. Between 1936 and 1941 SK Ljubljana was one of the top sides in Slovenia (winning the 1935–36 and 1940–41 Slovenian championships) and also competed in the Yugoslav First League, Kingdom of Yugoslavia's top national competition formed in 1923. In addition, Ilirija's Stanko Tavčar was the first Slovenian player who was capped for the Kingdom of Yugoslavia national football team in the period between the two world wars. He was member of their 1920 Olympics squad and appeared in matches against Czechoslovakia and Egypt, the first two games in the history of the team. SK Ljubljana operated until 1941 and the outbreak of World War II, when all sports activities in Ljubljana were suspended.

NK Ilirija (1950–1991)
After the World War II, with the help of some pre-war former players, the club was refounded in 1950. They were now located in the outskirts of Ljubljana in Zgornja Šiška, where they built their own modern stadium in 1963. They played mostly in Slovenian Republic League, an amateur third-level league in SFR Yugoslavia. Their biggest success was becoming vice-champions in 1972. The team, composed of Jerebic, Rojina, Šmon, Erjavec, Kolenc, Dermastija, Godler, Ahlin, Filip, Jalšavec, Jesenšek, Daneu and Prelovšek, therefore contested for amateur championship of Yugoslavia that year, but lost against Vrbas in the final. In 1986 Ilirija was relegated from republic league and continued playing in local regional leagues until the dissolution of Yugoslavia.

Since 1991
Since the independence of Slovenia, Ilirija played a couple of seasons in the newly established Slovenian Second League. In the 1992–93 season, Ilirija finished 15th and were subsequently relegated to the Slovenian Third League. Since then, Ilirja competed in leagues outside of the top two divisions until 2017, when they returned to the Slovenian Second League.

Colours and crest

The traditional colours of Ilirija are green and white, the colours strongly associated with the city of Ljubljana. Although green and white were club colours from the very beginning, Ilirija usually wore red-white kits with a star in the early years, a hommage to Slavia Prague.

The club crest depicts a name, foundation year and a column in doric order. The name itself is a reference to the historical region of Illyria.

Stadium
In the interwar period, Ilirija played its home matches on the field by Celovška Road, which was built in 1919 and was located between the State Station and the Union Brewery. After World War II, Ilirija moved to Ilirija Sports Park, where the club's current home ground was built in 1963. It has a capacity of 1,000 and is the third largest stadium in Ljubljana. Apart from football, it also hosts speedway events.

Honours

Yugoslavia

Ljubljana Subassociation League
Winners: 1920, 1920–21, 1921–22, 1922–23, 1923–24, 1924–25, 1925–26, 1926–27, 1929–30, 1931–32, 1933–34, 1934–35
Ljubljana Subassociation Cup
Winners: 1926, 1927, 1928

Slovenia

Slovenian Third League
Winners: 2015–16, 2020–21
Slovenian Fourth Division
Winners: 1995–96
Slovenian Fifth Division
Winners: 2003–04, 2012–13
MNZ Ljubljana Cup
Winners: 2016–17

League history since 1991

Managers

References

External links
Official website 

ND Ilirija 1911
Association football clubs established in 1911
Football clubs in Slovenia
Football clubs in Yugoslavia
Football clubs in Ljubljana
20th-century establishments in Carniola
1911 establishments in Austria-Hungary